How To Avoid The Sun, alternately referred to as Rain 2, is the second Korean-language studio album by South Korean pop and R&B singer Rain. Commercially, the album peaked at number six on the monthly album charts in South Korea and was the 19th best-selling album of 2003 in the country, selling over 127,000 copies.

Singles
"How to Avoid the Sun" was released as the first single. The single put Rain on the map in Korea, going to number one on the charts. At the time of the album's release, there were two versions of the song: the radio mix, credited as the guitar remix, and the original version. The song lyrics describe feeling a love so strong that it is impossible to run from. The music video was shot in Seoul. In it, you see Rain running from the sun throughout the city, trying his best to avoid it, but always failing. 

On the May 10, 2007, episode of the Colbert Report, Stephen Colbert presented his audience with a parody of the "Ways to Avoid the Sun" music video. The parody featured Colbert singing in Korean and mimicking elements from the Rain video including running from the sun and dancing in a parking garage. The video was created in response to Rain topping Colbert in Times open online poll. 

"You Already Knew" was released as a promotional single as a follow-up to "How to Avoid the Sun".

Reception 
From October 2003 to February 2004, the album sold 166,731 copies in South Korea. In 2021, "How to Avoid the Sun" was ranked at number 62 in Melon and newspaper Seoul Shinmuns list of top 100 K-pop songs of all time, with critic Jung Min-jae praising "Rain's rich emotional performance" and wrote that it was through this work that solidified his career as a singer.

Accolades

Track listing

Charts

Weekly charts

Monthly charts

Year-end charts

Release history

References

Rain (entertainer) albums
JYP Entertainment albums
2003 albums
Korean-language albums